"The Secrets Broker" is the nineteenth episode of the third series of the 1960s cult British spy-fi television series The Avengers, starring Patrick Macnee and Honor Blackman. It was first broadcast by ABC on 1 February 1964. The episode was directed by Jonathan Alwyn and written by Ludovic Peters.

Plot
Spirits order a murder, leading to blackmail and a wine shop that is being used as a front for espionage activities.

Cast
 Patrick Macnee as John Steed
 Honor Blackman as Cathy Gale
 Avice Landone as Mrs. May Wilson 
 Jack May as Waller 
 Ronald Allen as Allan Paignton 
 John Stone as Frederick Paignton 
 Patricia English as Marion Howard 
 John Ringham as Cliff Howard 
 Brian Hankins as Jim Carey 
 Jennifer Wood as Julia Wilson 
 Valentino Musetti as Bruno

References

External links

Episode overview on The Avengers Forever! website

The Avengers (season 3) episodes
1964 British television episodes